Seth Jordan Galloway (born January 12, 1987, in Evansville, Indiana) is an American Samoan association football player.

Career
Galloway began his career with Dalat International School and joined in 2004 to Malaysia who signed for Chinese Recreational Club in Penang. In 2005 attended to studies to the Nyack College and played for the Warrior's soccer team. Galloway played besides his studying at the Nyack College 2005 for JYSA United in Louisville, Kentucky and for Chicago Eagles from 2005 to 2008. He signed in April 2009 for Balestier Khalsa FC and was two months later on 9 June 2009 released.

References

1987 births
Living people
American soccer players
American expatriate soccer players
American Samoan footballers
American Samoa international footballers
American Samoan expatriate footballers
Expatriate footballers in Singapore
Association football defenders
American Samoan expatriate sportspeople in Malaysia
Balestier Khalsa FC players
American Samoan expatriate sportspeople in Singapore
Singapore Premier League players
Nyack College alumni
American Samoan expatriate sportspeople in Taiwan
Sportspeople from Evansville, Indiana
A.A.C. Eagles players